Rougeotiana is a genus of moths of the family Erebidae. The genus was erected by Bernard Laporte in 1974.

Species
Rougeotiana busira (Strand, 1918)
Rougeotiana pseudonoctua Herbulot, 1983
Rougeotiana rogator (Bryk, 1915)
Rougeotiana xanthoperas (Hampson, 1926)

References

Calpinae